Jacques-Jean Barre (3 August 1793 in Paris-10 June 1855 in Paris) was the general engraver at the Monnaie de Paris between 1842 and 1855. In this position, he engraved and designed French medals, the Great Seal of France, bank notes and postage stamps, as well as the first Swiss coinage which was initially minted there.

His name is Jacques-Jean Barre but is often incorrectly labelled as 'Jean-Jacques', as it is the more common use of the name.

From the late 1840s until 1855, he created the first two French postage stamp designs: the Ceres series and Napoleon III series.

His two sons, artists themselves, succeeded him at the post of general engraver:
 Albert Désiré Barre
 and Jean-Auguste Barre (only during one year).

References

External links

French Postal Museum, Jacques-Jean Barre (in French)
 

1793 births
1855 deaths
19th-century engravers
French engravers
French stamp designers